WCTS (1030 kHz, "The Bible Station") is a non-commercial AM radio station licensed to Maplewood, Minnesota, and serving the Twin Cities.  It broadcasts a Christian talk and teaching radio format and is owned by the Central Baptist Theological Seminary of Minneapolis, hence the call letters.  The radio studios and offices are in Plymouth.

By day, WCTS is powered at 50,000 watts, the maximum for AM stations.  Because 1030 AM is a clear channel frequency reserved for WBZ in Boston, WCTS reduces power to 4,000 watts at night and uses a directional antenna at all times, with a five-tower array at night.  The transmitter is on Woodbury Drive at Glacial Valley Road in Woodbury.  Programming is also heard on 250 watt FM translator K250BY at 97.9 MHz in Plymouth.

History
The history of WCTS (1030 AM) comprises two stations: one at 100.3FM and the other at the current 1030 AM.

1030 AM
The station that is now WCTS started with a 250 watt daytime-only signal at 1010 AM. The station's sign-on date as WGHB is unclear; the Broadcasting Yearbook of 1964 lists the date as November 30, 1963, while the publication's 1965 edition lists the date as May 18, 1964.  WRCR is shown as the call sign by 1965. By 1968, the station carried the call letters WJSW, broadcasting polka music and other formats.

When WMIN dropped its longtime call letters in 1972, WJSW grabbed them and became the new WMIN. By this time, it was airing a full service, Middle of the Road (MOR) format. For many years, the station's transmitter site was located on South Century Drive in Maplewood, the city of license, where the studios were co-located.

In the mid 1980s, the station moved to 1030 AM, along with a significant boost in daytime power. It continued its MOR format and briefly simulcast KARE-TV's evening news.  WMIN played country music from 1986 to 1988 and then flipped to an oldies format, which evolved into adult standards a year later.

WCTS 100.3 FM
WCTS signed on in 1965 at 100.3 FM, with a format consisting mostly of conservative evangelists and Bible teachings by the Fourth Baptist Church in north Minneapolis.

Colfax Communications, a startup company based in Minneapolis, purchased the FM station in early 1993 and in turn bought 1030 AM to sell back to the seminary so the seminary would continue to have a broadcast voice. Colfax took the FM station off the air for a few months and signed on again as WBOB on May 13, launching a country music format under the "Bob 100" moniker.

WMIN became WCTS on February 5, 1993, and seminary programming remains to this day. The WMIN call letters were immediately picked up by a Hudson, Wisconsin-based station at 740 AM and used there until 2008, when that station changed its call letters to WDGY.

Translators

See also
 WMIN
 KMNV
 KTLK-FM

References

 Broadcasting Yearbooks

External links
Central Baptist Theological Seminary website

Christian radio stations in Minnesota
Moody Radio affiliate stations
Radio stations established in 1963
1963 establishments in Minnesota